Group E of the 2013 FIBA Asia Championship will take place from 5 to 7 August 2013. This is the second round of the 2013 FIBA Asia Championship. The four teams with the best record advance to 2013 FIBA Asia Championship final round.

All games will be played at the Mall of Asia Arena in Pasay, Philippines. The competing teams are top three teams in Group A and Group B.

Group A

Group B

Standings

The results and the points of the matches between the same teams that were already played during the preliminary round shall be taken into account for the second round.
|}
All times are local (UTC+8).

August 5

Qatar vs. Jordan

|-
|4 ||align=left|Mansour El Hadary || 16:57 || 4/7 || 57 || 1/2 || 50 || 1/2 || 50 || 0 || 3 || 3 || 1 || 0 || 0 || 0 || 3 || 10 
|-
|5 ||align=left|Jarvis Hayes || 32:36|| 6/14 || 43 || 2/6 || 33 || 1/2 || 50 || 1 || 3 || 4 || 3 || 1 || 1 || 0 || 4 || 15 
|-
|6 ||align=left|Abdulrahman Saad || 1:39 || 0/1 || 0 || 0/1 || 0 || 0/0 || 0 || 0 || 1 || 1 || 0 || 0 || 0 || 0 || 0 || 0 
|-
|7 ||align=left|Daoud Musa || 29:19 || 4/8 || 50 || 2/6 || 33 || 3/3 || 100 || 2 || 1 || 3 || 5 || 2 || 0 || 1 || 2 || 13 
|-
|8 ||align=left|Khalid Suliman || 19:14 || 1/4 || 25 || 0/2 || 0 || 0/2 || 0 || 0 || 4 || 4 || 1 || 1 || 1 || 1 || 0 || 2 
|-
|9 ||align=left|Ali Turki Ali || 19:53 || 1/6 || 17 || 1/5 || 20 || 2/2 || 100 || 1 || 2 || 3 || 1 || 1 || 0 || 0 || 2 || 5 
|-
|10 ||align=left|Yasseen Musa || 31:56 || 6/11 || 55 || 0/1 || 0 || 2/4 || 50 || 2 || 5 || 7 || 3 || 0 || 0 || 0 || 1 || 14 
|-
|11 ||align=left|Erfan Ali Saeed || 32:52 || 4/10 || 40 || 0/1 || 0 || 3/4 || 75 || 3 || 4 || 7 || 2 || 1 || 0 || 2 || 1 || 11 
|-
|12 ||align=left|Mohammed Saleem Abdulla || 05:03 || 1/1 || 100 || 0/0 || 0 || 0/1 || 0 || 0 || 0 || 0 || 0 || 0 || 0 || 0 || 1 || 2 
|-
|13 ||align=left|Mohammed Yousef || 08:23 || 1/3 || 3 || 1/3 || 33 || 0/0 || 0 || 0 || 2 || 2 || 0 || 0 || 0 || 0 || 2 || 3
|-
|14 ||align=left|Malek Saleem || 2:04 || 0/0 || 0 || 0/0 || 0 || 0/0 || 0 || 0 || 0 || 0 || 0 || 0 || 0 || 0 || 0 || 0 
|-
|15 ||align=left|Baker Ahmad Mohammed || colspan=16 align=left|Did not play
|-
|align=left colspan=2|Totals || || 28/65 || 43 || 7-27 || 26 || 12/20 || 60 || 9 || 25 || 34 || 16 || 6 || 2 || 4 || 16 || 75
|}

|-
|4 ||align=left|Fadel Alnajjar || 5:32 || 0/0 || 0 || 0/0 || 0 || 0/0 || 0 || 1 || 0 || 1  || 1 || 1 || 0 || 0 || 0 || 0 
|-
|5 ||align=left|Ahmad Al-Dwairi || 9:21 || 0/2 || 0 || 0/0 || 0 || 2/4 || 50 || 2 || 1 || 3 || 0 || 0 || 0 || 1 || 0 || 2
|-
|6 ||align=left|Hani Alfaraj || 15:32 || 2/3 || 67 || 1/1 || 100 || 0/0 || 0 || 0 || 1 || 1 || 0 || 0 || 1 || 0 || 2 || 5 
|-
|7 ||align=left|Ahmad Alhamarsheh || 30:32 || 1/3 || 33 || 0/1 || 0 || 0/0 || 0 || 2 || 5  || 7 || 1 || 3 || 1  || 0 || 2 || 2 
|-
|8 ||align=left|Jimmy Baxter || 38:14 || 5/17 || 29 || 1/4 || 25 || 1/2 || 50 || 1 || 3 || 4 || 2 || 0 || 0 || 0 || 0 || 12
|-
|9 ||align=left|Khaldoon Abu-Ruqayyah || 9:08 || 1/3 || 33 || 1/3 || 33 || 0/0 || 0 || 1 || 1 || 2 || 0 || 1 || 0 || 0 || 2 || 3 
|-
|10 ||align=left|Abdallah AbuQoura || colspan=16 align=left|Did not play
|-
|11 ||align=left|Wesam Al-Sous || 29:52 || 4/9 || 44 || 4/8 || 50 || 2/2 || 100 || 2 || 5 || 7 || 6 || 0 || 0 || 0 || 2 || 14 
|-
|12 ||align=left|Mahmoud Abdeen || 4:35 || 0/1 || 0 || 0/1 || 0 || 0/0 || 0 || 0 || 1 || 1 || 1 || 0 || 0 || 0 || 0 || 1 
|-
|13 ||align=left|Mohammad Shaher Hussein || 12:25 || 1/4 || 25 || 0/1 || 0 || 1/2 || 50 || 0 || 4 || 4 || 0 || 1 || 0 || 0 || 1 || 3 
|-
|14 ||align=left|Mohammad Hadrab || 28:18 || 6/16 || 38 || 0/3 || 0 || 4/4 || 100 || 2 || 2 || 4 || 1 || 1 || 0 || 2 || 5 || 16 
|-
|15 ||align=left|Ali Jamal Zaghab || 16:26 || 2/4 || 50 || 0/0 || 0 || 0/0 || 0 || 1 || 3 || 4 || 0 || 0 || 0 || 0 || 1 || 4 
|-
|align=left colspan=2|Totals || || 22/62 || 35 || 7/22 || 32 || 10/14 || 71 || 12 || 26 || 38 || 12 || 10 || 2 || 3 || 17 || 61 
|}

Chinese Taipei vs. Hong Kong

|-
|4 ||align=left|Tseng Wen-ting || 6:50 || 1/2 || 50 || 0/1 || 0 || 0/0 || 0 || 0 || 0 || 0 || 0 || 2 || 0 || 0 || 2 || 2 
|-
|5 ||align=left|Quincy Davis || 20:50 || 3/4 || 75 || 0/0 || 0 || 3/4 || 75 || 1 || 6 || 7 || 1 || 4 || 1 || 3 || 0 || 9 
|-
|6 ||align=left|Lee Hsueh-lin || colspan=16 align=left|Did not play
|-
|7 ||align=left|Tien Lei || 20:00 || 5/9 || 56 || 2/4 || 50 || 0/0 || 0 || 0 || 4 || 4 || 3 || 2 || 0 || 0 || 1 || 12 
|-
|8 ||align=left|Chen Shih-chieh || 18:46 || 4/5 || 80 || 1/1 || 100 || 4/4 || 100 || 0 || 3 || 3 || 4 || 0 || 3 || 0 || 1 || 13 
|-
|9 ||align=left|Hung Chih-shan || 21:13 || 3/7 || 43 || 1/4 || 25 || 0/0 || 0 || 0 || 6 || 6 || 1 || 1 || 1 || 0 || 4 || 7 
|-
|10 ||align=left|Chou Po-Chen || 14:47 || 3-4 || 75 || 1-1 || 100 || 0-1 || 0 || 0 || 2 || 2 || 1 || 2 || 2 || 2 || 3 || 7 
|-
|11 ||align=left|Yang Chin-min || 26:24 || 4-9 || 44 || 2-4 || 50 || 0-0 || 0 || 0 || 3 || 3 || 3 || 1 || 0 || 0 || 3 || 10
|-
|12 ||align=left|Lin Chih-chieh || 13:35 || 2-5 || 40 || 1-4 || 25 || 1-2 || 50 || 0 || 3 || 3 || 6 || 0 || 0 || 0 || 0 || 6
|-
|13 ||align=left|Lu Cheng-ju || 16:55 || 3-5 || 60 || 3-4 || 75 || 2-2 || 100 || 0 || 1 || 1 || 2 || 1 || 0 || 0 || 0 || 11 
|-
|14 ||align=left|Tsai Wen-cheng || 23:04 || 2-4 || 50 || 0-0 || 0 || 2-3 || 67 || 2 || 2 || 4 || 1 || 1 || 0 || 0 || 1 || 6
|-
|15 ||align=left|Douglas Creighton || 17:31 || 4-5 || 80 || 3-4 || 75 || 0-0 || 0 || 1 || 6 || 7 || 2 || 0 || 0 || 0 || 0 || 11 
|-
|align=left colspan=2|Totals || || 34-59 || 58 || 14-27 || 52 || 12-16 || 75 || 4 || 36 || 40 || 24 || 14 || 7 || 5 || 15 || 94
|}

|-
|4 ||align=left|Man Chun Lam || 06:38 || 1-2 || 50 || 0-1 || 0 || 1-2 || 50 || 0 || 0 || 0 || 1 || 0 || 0 || 0 || 1 || 3
|-
|5 ||align=left|Tsz Lai Lau || 19:09 || 1-6 || 17 || 1-6 || 17 || 0-0 || 0 || 0 || 1 || 1 || 1 || 0 || 0 || 0 || 1 || 3
|-
|6 ||align=left|Ki Lee || 15:48 || 2-8 || 25 || 1-3 || 33 || 0-0 || 0 || 0 || 1 || 1 || 1 || 1 || 0 || 0 || 2 || 5
|-00
|7 ||align=left|Kim Wong Li || 27:56 || 2-8 || 25 || 0-3 || 0 || 0-2 || 0 || 2 || 1 || 3 || 2 || 4 || 0 || 0 || 3 || 4
|-
|8 ||align=left|Siu Wing Chan || 24:58 || 1-6 || 17 || 1-5 || 20 || 0-0 || 0 || 1 || 4 || 5 || 2 || 1 || 1 || 0 || 1 || 3
|-
|9 ||align=left|Tung Leung Lau || 11:12 || 2-3 || 67 || 0-0 || 0 || 0-0 || 0 || 0 || 0 || 0 || 0 || 3 || 0 || 0 || 1 || 4
|-
|10 ||align=left|Yik Lun Chan || 21:04 || 3-7 || 43 || 3-5 || 60 || 0-0 || 0 || 0 || 1 || 1 || 1 || 0 || 0 || 0 || 1 || 9
|-
|11 ||align=left|Chi Ho Poon || colspan=16 align=left|Did not play
|-
|12 ||align=left|Shing Yee Fong || 24:12 || 5-13 || 38 || 1-2 || 50 || 2-2 || 100 || 7 || 8 || 15 || 2 || 2 || 0 || 0 || 3 || 13
|-
|13 ||align=left|Chun Wai Wong || 19:49 || 1-8 || 13 || 0-4 || 0 || 0-0 || 0 || 0 || 4 || 4 || 1 || 1 || 1 || 0 || 4 || 2
|-
|14 ||align=left|Duncan Overbeck Reid || 29:08 || 3-10 || 30 || 0-0 || 0 || 3-4 || 75 || 1 || 3 || 4 || 1 || 3 || 1 || 0 || 0 || 9
|-
|15 ||align=left|Wai Kit Szeto || colspan=16 align=left|Did not play
|-
|align=left colspan=2|Totals || || 21-71 || 30 || 7-29 || 24 || 6-10 || 60 || 11 || 23 || 34 || 12 || 15 || 3 || 0 || 17 || 55
|}

Philippines vs. Japan

|-
|4 ||align=left|Jimmy Alapag ||15 ||2/3 ||67 ||2/3 ||67 ||0/0 ||0 ||0 ||3 ||3 ||6 ||2 ||1 ||0 ||0 ||6 
|-
|5 ||align=left|LA Tenorio ||15 ||1/7 ||14 ||1/3 ||33 ||6/7 ||88 ||0 ||3 ||3 ||2 ||1 ||2 ||2 ||0 ||9 
|-
|6 ||align=left|Jeffrei Chan ||19 ||6/7 ||86 ||4/5 ||80 ||0/0 ||0 ||0 ||1 ||1 ||1 ||2 ||3 ||0 ||0 ||16 
|-
|7 ||align=left|Jayson William ||18 ||2/9 ||22 ||0/1 ||0 ||3/3 ||100 ||0 ||0 ||0 ||3 ||2 ||0 ||2 ||0 ||7 
|-
|8 ||align=left|Gary David ||12 ||2/5 ||40 ||1-3 ||33 ||0/0 ||0 ||0 ||0 ||0 ||0 ||1 ||0 ||0 ||0 ||5 
|-
|9 ||align=left|Ranidel de Ocampo ||11 ||3/4 ||75 ||0/3 ||0 ||0/0 ||0 ||1 ||1 ||2 ||2 ||0 ||0 ||2 ||0 ||9 
|-
|10 ||align=left|Gabe Norwood ||18 ||0/0 ||0 ||2/2 ||100 ||3/4 ||75 ||0 ||3 ||3 ||2 ||3 ||0 ||1 ||0 ||7 
|-
|11 ||align=left|Marcus Douthit ||25 ||0/0 ||0 ||7/14 ||50 ||5/5 ||100 ||0 ||10 ||10 ||3 ||2 ||2 ||2 ||2 ||19 
|-
|12 ||align=left|Larry Fonacier ||23 ||1/1 ||100 ||0/1 ||0 ||0/0 ||0 ||1 ||3 ||4 ||2 ||1 ||0 ||0 ||0 ||3 
|-
|13 ||align=left|June Mar Fajardo ||04 ||0/0 ||0 ||0/1 ||0 ||0/0 ||0 ||0 ||0 ||0 ||0 ||2 ||0 ||0 ||1 ||0 
|-
|14 ||align=left|Japeth Aguilar ||17 ||3/3 ||75 ||0 ||100 ||1/2 ||50 ||1 ||0 ||1 ||0 ||3 ||0 ||0 ||1 ||7 
|-
|15 ||align=left|Marc Pingris ||22 ||0/0 ||0 ||1/1 ||100 ||0/0 ||0 ||1 ||1 ||2 ||3 ||3 ||1 ||2 ||1 ||2 
|-
|align=left colspan=2|Totals ||200 ||30/61 ||49 ||12/20 ||44 ||18/21 ||86 ||5 ||25 ||30 ||24 ||22 ||10 ||11 ||5 ||90
|}

|-
|4 ||align=left|Keijuro Matsui ||14 ||2/5 ||40 ||2/5 ||20 ||0/0 ||0 ||0 ||2 ||2 ||1 ||0 ||1 ||0 ||0 ||6 
|-
|5 ||align=left|Daiki Tanaka ||02 ||0/0 ||0 ||0/0 ||0 ||0/0 ||0 ||0 ||0 ||0 ||0 ||0 ||1 ||0 ||0 ||0 
|-
|6 ||align=left|Makoto Hiejima ||18 ||3/11 ||27 ||1/3 ||33 ||2/2 ||100 ||3 ||2 ||5 ||3 ||3 ||1 ||2 ||0 ||9 
|-
|7 ||align=left|Atsuya Ota ||6 ||1/4 ||25 ||0/0 ||0 ||0/0 ||0 ||3 ||1 ||4 ||1 ||0 ||2 ||0 ||0 ||2 
|-
|8 ||align=left|Yuta Watanabe ||5 ||1/3 ||33 ||0/0 ||0 ||0/0 ||0 ||0 ||0 ||0 ||0 ||1 ||0 ||0 ||0 ||2 
|-
|9 ||align=left|Takahiro Kurihara ||22 ||1/4 ||25 ||0/1 ||0 ||0/0 ||0 ||0 ||1 ||1 ||3 ||3 ||0 ||0 ||0 ||2 
|-
|10 ||align=left|Kosuke Takeuchi ||32 ||7/11 ||64 ||0/1 ||0 ||3/4 ||75 ||2 ||7 ||9 ||0 ||2 ||2 ||0 ||2 ||17 
|-
|11 ||align=left|Ryota Sakurai ||16 ||0/2 ||0 ||0/0 ||0 ||2/2 ||100 ||1 ||2 ||3 ||0 ||4 ||3 ||0 ||0 ||2 
|-
|12 ||align=left|J.R. Sakuragi ||30 ||6/14 ||43 ||1/1 ||100 ||6/7 ||86 ||6 ||7 ||13 ||3 ||1 ||2 ||0 ||1 ||19 
|-
|13 ||align=left|Naoto Tsuji ||27 ||3/7 ||43 ||2/4 ||50 ||0/0 ||0 ||0 ||1 ||1 ||1 ||1 ||4 ||0 ||0 ||8 
|-
|14 ||align=left|Kosuke Kanamaru ||22 ||2/8 ||25 ||0/3 ||0 ||0/0 ||0 ||1 ||1 ||2 ||0 ||1 ||2 ||0 ||0 ||4 
|-
|15 ||align=left|Hiroshi Ichioka ||7 ||0/1 ||0 ||0/0 ||0 ||0/0 ||0 ||1 ||1 ||2 ||0 ||3 ||0 ||0 ||1 ||0 
|-
|align=left colspan=2|Totals ||200 ||26/70 ||37 ||6/18 ||33 ||13/15 ||87 ||21 ||27 ||48 ||12 ||19 ||19 ||2 ||4 ||71
|}

August 6

Jordan vs. Hong Kong

|-
|4 ||align=left|Fadel Alnajjar || 22:34 || 3-10 || 30 || 0-7 || 0 || 1-4 || 25 || 0 || 5 || 5 || 5 || 1 || 1 || 0 || 2 || 7
|-
|5 ||align=left|Ahmad Al-Dwairi || 18:35 || 1-1 || 100 || 0-0 || 0 || 2-2 || 100 || 4 || 4 || 8 || 0 || 2 || 0 || 1 || 4 || 4
|-
|6 ||align=left|Hani Alfaraj || 17:21 || 2-4 || 50 || 0-2 || 0 || 0-0 || 0 || 3 || 1 || 4 || 0 || 2 || 1 || 0 || 0 || 4
|-
|7 ||align=left|Ahmad Alhamarsheh || 18:51 || 2-4 || 50 || 1-2 || 50 || 2-2 || 100 || 0 || 4 || 4 || 4 || 2 || 0 || 0 || 0 || 7
|-
|8 ||align=left|Jimmy Baxter || 21:11 || 1-6 || 17 || 0-3 || 0 || 0-0 || 0 || 0 || 2 || 2 || 3 || 3 || 1 || 0 || 0 || 2
|-
|9 ||align=left|Khaldoon Abu-Ruqayyah || colspan=16 align=left|Did not play
|-
|10 ||align=left|Abdallah AbuQoura || 19:34 || 3-6 || 50 || 0-1 || 0 || 0-0 || 0 || 3 || 1 || 4 || 0 || 1 || 0 || 0 || 0 || 6
|-
|11 ||align=left|Wesam Al-Sous || 16:18 || 3-8 || 38 || 2-5 || 40 || 0-0 || 0 || 0 || 4 || 4 || 1 || 2 || 0 || 0 || 1 || 8
|-
|12 ||align=left|Mahmoud Abdeen || 23:41 || 5-12 || 42 || 2-5 || 40 || 1-1 || 100 || 1 || 3 || 4 || 1 || 2 || 1 || 0 || 3 || 13
|-
|13 ||align=left|Mohammad Shaher Hussein || 21:24 || 3-8 || 38 || 0-1 || 0 || 2-2 || 100 || 4 || 4 || 8 || 1 || 2 || 2 || 0 || 1 || 8 
|-
|14 ||align=left|Mohammad Hadrab || 20:25 || 7-10 || 70 || 2-2 || 100 || 5-6 || 83 || 3 || 4 || 7 || 2 || 0 || 0 || 0 || 1 || 21
|-
|15 ||align=left|Ali Jamal Zaghab || colspan=16 align=left|Did not play
|-
|align=left colspan=2|Totals || || 30-69 || 43 || 7-28 || 25 || 13-17 || 76 || 18 || 32 || 50 || 17 || 17 || 6 || 1 || 12 || 80
|}

|-
|4 ||align=left|Man Chun Lam || 18:30 || 2-5 || 40 || 1-3 || 33 || 2-2 || 100 || 3 || 2 || 5 || 2 || 2 || 0 || 0 || 3 || 7
|-
|5 ||align=left|Tsz Lai Lau || 16:11 || 2-6 || 33 || 2-4 || 50 || 0-0 || 0 || 1 || 1 || 2 || 2 || 1 || 0 || 0 || 0 || 6 
|-
|6 ||align=left|Ki Lee || 24:09 || 3-8 || 38 || 1-5 || 20 || 0-0 || 0 || 2 || 1 || 3 || 2 || 1 || 0 || 0 || 3 || 7
|-00
|7 ||align=left|Kim Wong Li || 18:07 || 1-4 || 25 || 0-1 || 0 || 2-2 || 100 || 0 || 1 || 1 || 1 || 4 || 0 || 0 || 1 || 4
|-
|8 ||align=left|Siu Wing Chan || 24:59 || 2-7 || 29 || 1-4 || 25 || 0-0 || 0 || 1 || 1 || 2 || 3 || 1 || 3 || 0 || 0 || 5 
|-
|9 ||align=left|Tung Leung Lau || 21:31 || 3-8 || 38 || 0-0 || 0 || 2-2 || 100 || 2 || 2 || 4 || 1 || 4 || 0 || 0 || 1 || 8
|-
|10 ||align=left|Yik Lun Chan || 04:49 || 0-4 || 0 || 0-2 || 0 || 0-0 || 0 || 1 || 2 || 3 || 0 || 0 || 0 || 0 || 0 || 0
|-
|11 ||align=left|Chi Ho Poon || colspan=16 align=left|Did not play
|-
|12 ||align=left|Shing Yee Fong || 24:26 || 5-10 || 50 || 0-0 || 0 || 0-0 || 0 || 1 || 2 || 3 || 1 || 4 || 1 || 1 || 5 || 10
|-
|13 ||align=left|Chun Wai Wong || 23:52 || 1-6 || 17 || 0-2 || 0 || 0-1 || 0 || 1 || 5 || 6 || 1 || 1 || 0 || 0 || 3 || 2
|-
|14 ||align=left|Duncan Overbeck Reid || 19:34 || 2-6 || 33 || 0-0 || 0 || 1-2 || 50 || 1 || 0 || 1 || 0 || 0 || 0 || 1 || 0 || 5
|-
|15 ||align=left|Wai Kit Szeto || 03:46 || 0-0 || 0 || 0-0 || 0 || 0-0 || 0 || 0 || 0 || 0 || 0 || 0 || 0 || 0 || 0 || 0
|-
|align=left colspan=2|Totals || || 21-64 || 33 || 5-21 || 24 || 7-9 || 78 || 13 || 17 || 30 || 13 || 18 || 4 || 2 || 16 || 54
|}

Japan vs. Chinese Taipei

|-
|4 ||align=left|Keijuro Matsui || colspan=16 align=left|Did not play 
|-
|5 ||align=left|Daiki Tanaka || 17:02 || 3-6 || 50 || 2-2 || 100 || 0-0 || 0 || 1 || 1 || 2 || 0 || 0 || 0 || 0 || 3 || 8
|-
|6 ||align=left|Makoto Hiejima || 04:04 || 0-1 || 0 || 0-1 || 0 || 0-0 || 0 || 0 || 0 || 0 || 1 || 1 || 0 || 0 || 2 || 0
|-
|7 ||align=left|Atsuya Ota || 04:03 || 1-1 || 100 || 0-0 || 0 || 0-0 || 0 || 1 || 0 || 1 || 0 || 0 || 0 || 0 || 0 || 2
|-
|8 ||align=left|Yuta Watanabe || colspan=16 align=left|Did not play
|-
|9 ||align=left|Takahiro Kurihara || 15:16 || 2-2 || 100 || 0-0 || 0 || 1-2 || 50 || 2 || 0 || 2 || 0 || 0 || 1 || 0 || 1 || 5 
|-
|10 ||align=left|Kosuke Takeuchi || 35:56 || 7-17 || 41 || 0-1 || 0 || 3-5 || 60 || 2 || 5 || 7 || 2 || 2 || 1 || 1 || 2 || 17
|-
|11 ||align=left|Ryota Sakurai || 34:08 || 5-7 || 71 || 1-2 || 50 || 2-2 || 100 || 1 || 3 || 4 || 8 || 3 || 0 || 1 || 2 || 13
|-
|12 ||align=left|J.R. Sakuragi || 32:49 || 5-11 || 45 || 0-1 || 0 || 0-0 || 0 || 2 || 10 || 12 || 4 || 3 || 0 || 0 || 4 || 10
|-
|13 ||align=left|Naoto Tsuji || 17:09 || 1-7 || 14 || 1-6 || 17 || 3-3 || 100 || 0 || 1 || 1 || 2 || 0 || 1 || 0 || 4 || 6
|-
|14 ||align=left|Kosuke Kanamaru || 32:18 || 5-12 || 42 || 1-6 || 17 || 3-4 || 75 || 0 || 2 || 2 || 1 || 1 || 1 || 0 || 0 || 14
|-
|15 ||align=left|Hiroshi Ichioka || 07:10 || 0-0 || 0 || 0-0 || 0 || 1-2 || 50 || 1 || 1 || 2 || 1 || 0 || 0 || 0 || 4 || 1
|-
|align=left colspan=2|Totals || || 29-64 || 45 || 5-19 || 26 || 13-18 || 72 || 10 || 23 || 33 || 19 || 10 || 4 || 2 || 22 || 76
|}

|-
|4 ||align=left|Tseng Wen-ting || 22:26 || 6-10 || 60 || 2-3 || 67 || 5-7 || 71 || 2 || 2 || 4 || 1 || 2 || 0 || 1 || 0 || 19
|-
|5 ||align=left|Quincy Davis || 29:58 || 3-10 || 30 || 0-0 || 0 || 2-2 || 100 || 4 || 8 || 12 || 1 || 1 || 0 || 0 || 0 || 8
|-
|6 ||align=left|Lee Hsueh-lin || 16:21 || 0-0 || 0 || 0-0 || 0 || 0-0 || 0 || 1 || 2 || 3 || 1 || 0 || 0 || 0 || 3 || 0
|-
|7 ||align=left|Tien Lei || 27:29 || 5-12 || 42 || 0-3 || 0 || 0-0 || 0 || 1 || 5 || 6 || 5 || 0 || 1 || 0 || 4 || 10 
|-
|8 ||align=left|Chen Shih-chieh || 21:17 || 3-12 || 25 || 0-3 || 0 || 4-4 || 100 || 3 || 2 || 5 || 1 || 0 || 1 || 0 || 0 || 10
|-
|9 ||align=left|Hung Chih-shan || 02:24 || 0-1 || 0 || 0-0 || 0 || 0-0 || 0 || 0 || 0 || 0 || 0 || 0 || 0 || 0 || 1 || 0
|-
|10 ||align=left|Chou Po-Chen || 00:02 || 0-0 || 0 || 0-0 || 0 || 0-0 || 0 || 0 || 0 || 0 || 0 || 0 || 0 || 0 || 0 || 0
|-
|11 ||align=left|Yang Chin-min || 23:31 || 1-4 || 25 || 1-2 || 50 || 0-0 || 0 || 1 || 2 || 3 || 2 || 0 || 1 || 0 || 4 || 3
|-
|12 ||align=left|Lin Chih-chieh || 27:24 || 5-11 || 45 || 2-7 || 29 || 4-5 || 80 || 2 || 4 || 6 || 1 || 5 || 0 || 0 || 2 || 16
|-
|13 ||align=left|Lu Cheng-ju || 12:56 || 2-4 || 50 || 1-3 || 33 || 1-1 || 100 || 0 || 0 || 0 || 0 || 3 || 2 || 0 || 3 || 6
|-
|14 ||align=left|Tsai Wen-cheng || 16:03 || 1-3 || 33 || 0-0 || 0 || 5-5 || 100 || 3 || 2 || 5 || 0 || 2 || 1 || 0 || 1 || 7
|-
|15 ||align=left|Douglas Creighton || 00:02 || 0-0 || 0 || 0-0 || 0 || 0-0 || 0 || 0 || 0 || 0 || 0 || 0 || 0 || 0 || 0 || 0
|-
|align=left colspan=2|Totals || || 26-67 || 39 || 6-21 || 29 || 21-24 || 88 || 17 || 27 || 44 || 12 || 13 || 6 || 1 || 18 || 79
|}

Philippines vs. Qatar

|-
|4 ||align=left|Jimmy Alapag || 09:27 || 1-5 || 20 || 1-4 || 25 || 2-2 || 100 || 0 || 2 || 2 || 2 || 2 || 0 || 0 || 2 || 5 
|-
|5 ||align=left|LA Tenorio || 16:16 || 2-7 || 29 || 1-5 || 20 || 2-2 || 100 || 1 || 3 || 4 || 3 || 0 || 0 || 0 || 3 || 7
|-
|6 ||align=left|Jeffrei Chan || 27:23 || 4-7 || 57 || 3-5 || 60 || 1-2 || 50 || 0 || 6 || 6 || 1 || 0 || 0 || 0 || 1 || 12
|-
|7 ||align=left|Jayson William || 14:22 || 1-4 || 25 || 0-1 || 0 || 5-5 || 100 || 1 || 3 || 4 || 1 || 1 || 0 || 0 || 0 || 7
|-
|8 ||align=left|Gary David || 08:35 || 2-7 || 29 || 1-2 || 50 || 0-0 || 0 || 2 || 3 || 5 || 1 || 0 || 0 || 0 || 0 || 5
|-
|9 ||align=left|Ranidel de Ocampo || 16:51 || 2-6 || 33 || 0-2 || 0 || 0-0 || 0 || 0 || 2 || 2 || 0 || 1 || 0 || 0 || 1 || 4 
|-
|10 ||align=left|Gabe Norwood || 27:49 || 1-3 || 33 || 1-2 || 50 || 0-0 || 0 || 0 || 2 || 2 || 1 || 1 || 0 || 2 || 0 || 3
|-
|11 ||align=left|Marcus Douthit || 28:33 || 7-13 || 54 || 0-0 || 0 || 5-6 || 83 || 3 || 11 || 14 || 4 || 4 || 0 || 1 || 3 || 19
|-
|12 ||align=left|Larry Fonacier || 11:32 || 0-4 || 0 || 0-3 || 0 || 2-2 || 100 || 0 || 1 || 1 || 0 || 1 || 0 || 0 || 2 || 2
|-
|13 ||align=left|June Mar Fajardo || 02:08 || 0-0 || 0 || 0-0 || 0 || 0-0 || 0 || 0 || 0 || 0 || 0 || 0 || 0 || 0 || 1 || 0
|-
|14 ||align=left|Japeth Aguilar || 17:35 || 5-6 || 83 || 0-0 || 0 || 4-5 || 80 || 2 || 5 || 7 || 0 || 0 || 0 || 1 || 3 || 14 
|-
|15 ||align=left|Marc Pingris || 19:23 || 1-3 || 33 || 0-0 || 0 || 0-0 || 0 || 1 || 5 || 6 || 0 || 2 || 0 || 1 || 2 || 2
|-
|align=left colspan=2|Totals || || 26-65 || 40 || 7-24 || 29 || 21-24 || 88 || 10 || 43 || 53 || 13 || 12 || 0 || 5 || 18 || 80
|}

|-
|4 ||align=left|Mansour El Hadary || 25:51 || 2-8 || 25 || 0-2 || 0 || 1-2 || 50 || 1 || 3 || 4 || 5 || 1 || 0 || 0 || 4 || 5
|-
|5 ||align=left|Jarvis Hayes || 35:18 || 7-17 || 41 || 2-4 || 50 || 1-4 || 25 || 2 || 9 || 11 || 1 || 1 || 0 || 0 || 0 || 17
|-
|6 ||align=left|Abdulrahman Saad || 02:45 || 0-1 || 0 || 0-1 || 0 || 0-0 || 0 || 0 || 2 || 2 || 0 || 0 || 0 || 0 || 3 || 0
|-
|7 ||align=left|Daoud Musa || 23:16 || 3-10 || 30 || 1-5 || 20 || 1-1 || 100 || 0 || 4 || 4 || 3 || 0 || 1 || 0 || 1 || 8 
|-
|8 ||align=left|Khalid Suliman || 17:13 || 2-9 || 22 || 2-4 || 50 || 3-6 || 50 || 4 || 0 || 4 || 1 || 2 || 0 || 0 || 3 || 9
|-
|9 ||align=left|Ali Turki Ali || 09:47 || 0-4 || 0 || 0-3 || 0 || 0-0 || 0 || 0 || 0 || 0 || 0 || 0 || 0 || 0 || 0 || 0 
|-
|10 ||align=left|Yasseen Musa || 23:56 || 3-7 || 43 || 0-2 || 0 || 2-2 || 100 || 2 || 5 || 7 || 0 || 1 || 1 || 0 || 2 || 8
|-
|11 ||align=left|Erfan Ali Saeed || 28:46 || 6-14 || 43 || 0-4 || 0 || 1-1 || 100 || 2 || 2 || 4 || 1 || 0 || 1 || 1 || 2 || 13
|-
|12 ||align=left|Mohammed Saleem Abdulla || 06:07 || 1-2 || 50 || 0-0 || 0 || 0-0 || 0 || 0 || 0 || 0 || 0 || 0 || 0 || 0 || 1 || 2 
|-
|13 ||align=left|Mohammed Yousef || 10:26 || 1-1 || 100 || 0-0 || 0 || 2-2 || 100 || 1 || 2 || 3 || 1 || 0 || 1 || 0 || 3 || 4
|-
|14 ||align=left|Malek Saleem || 06:04 || 0-1 || 0 || 0-1 || 0 || 0-0 || 0 || 0 || 0 || 0 || 0 || 0 || 0 || 0 || 0 || 0
|-
|15 ||align=left|Baker Ahmad Mohammed || 10:27 || 1-5 || 20 || 0-0 || 0 || 2-2 || 100 || 0 || 2 || 2 || 1 || 1 || 0 || 0 || 0 || 4
|-
|align=left colspan=2|Totals || || 26-79 || 33 || 5-26 || 19 || 13-20 || 65 || 12 || 29 || 41 || 13 || 6 || 4 || 1 || 19 || 70
|}

August 7

Japan vs. Jordan

|-
|4 ||align=left|Keijuro Matsui || 02:57 || 0-1 || 0 || 0-0 || 0 || 0-0 || 0 || 0 || 0 || 0 || 0 || 0 || 0 || 0 || 2 || 0
|-
|5 ||align=left|Daiki Tanaka || 08:37 || 1-2 || 50 || 0-1 || 0 || 0-0 || 0 || 0 || 0 || 0 || 0 || 0 || 0 || 0 || 0 || 2
|-
|6 ||align=left|Makoto Hiejima || 20:25 || 1-6 || 17 || 0-0 || 0 || 2-2 || 100 || 0 || 2 || 2 || 4 || 0 || 2 || 0 || 1 || 4
|-
|7 ||align=left|Atsuya Ota || colspan=16 align=left|Did not play
|-
|8 ||align=left|Yuta Watanabe || colspan=16 align=left|Did not play
|-
|9 ||align=left|Takahiro Kurihara || 25:55 || 4-8 || 50 || 0-1 || 0 || 0-0 || 0 || 1 || 1 || 2 || 0 || 3 || 0 || 0 || 4 || 8 
|-
|10 ||align=left|Kosuke Takeuchi || 33:05 || 2-8 || 25 || 0-0 || 0 || 3-4 || 75 || 1 || 4 || 5 || 3 || 1 || 1 || 2 || 3 || 7
|-
|11 ||align=left|Ryota Sakuragi || 22:23 || 1-2 || 50 || 0-1 || 0 || 2-6 || 33 || 2 || 1 || 3 || 3 || 2 || 0 || 0 || 4 || 4
|-
|12 ||align=left|J.R. Sakuragi || 33:42 || 1-10 || 10 || 0-1 || 0 || 3-4 || 75 || 1 || 9 || 10 || 2 || 3 || 1 || 0 || 3 || 5
|-
|13 ||align=left|Naoto Tsuji || 18:01 || 5-12 || 42 || 4-10 || 40 || 0-0 || 0 || 0 || 0 || 0 || 0 || 0 || 1 || 0 || 1 || 14
|-
|14 ||align=left|Kosuke Kanamaru || 21:38 || 2-9 || 22 || 1-5 || 20 || 0-0 || 0 || 1 || 3 || 4 || 0 || 1 || 0 || 0 || 2 || 5
|-
|15 ||align=left|Hiroshi Ichioka || 13:11 || 3-7 || 43 || 0-0 || 0 || 1-2 || 50 || 4 || 1 || 5 || 0 || 0 || 0 || 2 || 1 || 7
|-
|align=left colspan=2|Totals || || 20-65 || 31 || 5-19 || 26 || 11-18 || 61 || 10 || 21 || 31 || 12 || 10 || 5 || 4 || 21 || 56
|}

|-
|4 ||align=left|Fadel Alnajjar || 00:40 || 0-0 || 0 || 0-0 || 0 || 1-2 || 50 || 0 || 0 || 0 || 0 || 0 || 0 || 0 || 0 || 1 
|-
|5 ||align=left|Ahmad Al-Dwairi || 08:24 || 1-1 || 100 || 0-0 || 0 || 0-0 || 0 || 0 || 1 || 1 || 0 || 2 || 0 || 0 || 4 || 2
|-
|6 ||align=left|Hani Alfaraj || 09:30 || 0-0 || 0 || 0-0 || 0 || 1-2 || 50 || 0 || 0 || 0 || 1 || 1 || 0 || 1 || 1 || 1
|-
|7 ||align=left|Ahmad Alhamarsheh || 33:06 || 3-4 || 75 || 2-3 || 67 || 2-2 || 100 || 1 || 5 || 6 || 1 || 0 || 0 || 0 || 3 || 10
|-
|8 ||align=left|Jimmy Baxter || 37:15 || 6-16 || 38 || 1-5 || 20 || 3-4 || 75 || 0 || 6 || 6 || 1 || 3 || 3 || 0 || 0 || 16
|-
|9 ||align=left|Khaldoon Abu-Ruqayyah || 00:40 || 0-0 || 0 || 0-0 || 0 || 0-0 || 0 || 0 || 0 || 0 || 0 || 0 || 0 || 0 || 0 || 0
|-
|10 ||align=left|Abdallah AbuQoura || colspan=16 align=left|Did not play
|-
|11 ||align=left|Wesam Al-Sous || 30:42 || 3-11 || 27 || 1-8 || 13 || 2-4 || 50 || 0 || 4 || 4 || 5 || 3 || 0 || 0 || 2 || 9
|-
|12 ||align=left|Mahmoud Abdeen || 08:45 || 0-2 || 0 || 0-2 || 0 || 1-2 || 50 || 0 || 2 || 2 || 0 || 2 || 0 || 0 || 0 || 1 
|-
|13 ||align=left|Mohammad Shaher Hussein || 30:31 || 7-11 || 64 || 0-0 || 0 || 1-3 || 33 || 12 || 7 || 19 || 1 || 3 || 1 || 0 || 1 || 15
|-
|14 ||align=left|Mohammad Hadrab || 24:22 || 2-7 || 29 || 1-3 || 33 || 1-2 || 50 || 1 || 7 || 8 || 0 || 1 || 0 || 3 || 4 || 6
|-
|15 ||align=left|Ali Jamal Zaghab || 16:00 || 2-6 || 33 || 0-1 || 0 || 0-0 || 0 || 0 || 2 || 2 || 0 || 4 || 0 || 0 || 2 || 4
|-
|align=left colspan=2|Totals || || 24-58 || 41 || 5-22 || 23 || 12-21 || 57 || 14 || 34 || 48 || 9 || 19 || 4 || 4 || 17 || 65
|}

Chinese Taipei vs. Qatar

|-
|4 ||align=left|Tseng Wen-ting || 25:24 || 1-4 || 25 || 0-2 || 0 || 1-2 || 50 || 1 || 2 || 3 || 3 || 3 || 3 || 3 || 0 || 3 
|-
|5 ||align=left|Quincy Davis || 32:26 || 7-11 || 64 || 0-0 || 0 || 9-11 || 82 || 1 || 7 || 8 || 0 || 1 || 0 || 0 || 0 || 23
|-
|6 ||align=left|Lee Hsueh-lin || 24:19 || 2-5 || 40 || 1-2 || 50 || 0-0 || 0 || 0 || 3 || 3 || 2 || 1 || 2 || 2 || 0 || 5
|-
|7 ||align=left|Tien Lei || 20:19 || 3-11 || 27 || 0-3 || 0 || 0-0 || 0 || 2 || 5 || 7 || 0 || 1 || 1 || 1 || 0 || 6
|-
|8 ||align=left|Chen Shih-chieh || 20:25 || 6-7 || 86 || 1-1 || 100 || 0-2 || 0 || 0 || 0 || 0 || 1 || 1 || 1 || 1 || 0 || 13
|-
|9 ||align=left|Hung Chih-shan || colspan=16 align=left|Did not play 
|-
|10 ||align=left|Chou Po-Chen || 00:08 || 0-0 || 0 || 0-0 || 0 || 0-0 || 0 || 0 || 0 || 0 || 0 || 0 || 0 || 0 || 0 || 0
|-
|11 ||align=left|Yang Chin-min || 11:52 || 2-3 || 67 || 0-1 || 0 || 3-4 || 75 || 1 || 0 || 1 || 0 || 1 || 0 || 0 || 0 || 7
|-
|12 ||align=left|Lin Chih-chieh || 19:03 || 0-5 || 0 || 0-5 || 0 || 0-0 || 0 || 0 || 1 || 1 || 4 || 4 || 0 || 0 || 0 || 0
|-
|13 ||align=left|Lu Cheng-ju || 26:36 || 2-8 || 25 || 2-6 || 33 || 0-0 || 0 || 0 || 4 || 4 || 1 || 2 || 1 || 0 || 0 || 6
|-
|14 ||align=left|Tsai Wen-cheng || 04:19 || 0-0 || 0 || 0-0 || 0 || 0-0 || 0 || 2 || 0 || 2 || 0 || 0 || 0 || 0 || 0 || 0
|-
|15 ||align=left|Douglas Creighton || 15:03 || 2-5 || 40 || 1-3 || 33 || 0-0 || 0 || 1 || 2 || 3 || 0 || 1 || 1 || 1 || 0 || 5
|-
|align=left colspan=2|Totals || || 25-59 || 42 || 5-23 || 22 || 13-19 || 68 || 8 || 24 || 32 || 11 || 15 || 9 || 9 || 0 || 68
|}

|-
|4 ||align=left|Mansour El Hadary || 12:48 || 1-3 || 33 || 0-0 || 0 || 0-0 || 0 || 0 || 1 || 1 || 1 || 1 || 0 || 0 || 5 || 2
|-
|5 ||align=left|Jarvis Hayes || 36:49 || 6-15 || 40 || 0-5 || 0 || 1-2 || 50 || 3 || 4 || 7 || 2 || 4 || 0 || 0 || 3 || 13
|-
|6 ||align=left|Abdulrahman Saad || colspan=16 align=left|Did not play 
|-
|7 ||align=left|Daoud Musa || 31:26 || 4-12 || 33 || 2-8 || 25 || 0-0 || 0 || 1 || 5 || 6 || 4 || 2 || 2 || 0 || 4 || 10
|-
|8 ||align=left|Khalid Suliman || 20:16 || 0-5 || 0 || 0-1 || 0 || 4-4 || 100 || 1 || 0 || 1 || 2 || 1 || 0 || 0 || 1 || 4
|-
|9 ||align=left|Ali Turki Ali || 21:25 || 2-6 || 33 || 1-4 || 25 || 2-2 || 100 || 1 || 3 || 4 || 1 || 1 || 0 || 0 || 1 || 7
|-
|10 ||align=left|Yasseen Musa || 35:27 || 9-15 || 60 || 0-2 || 0 || 2-2 || 100 || 9 || 10 || 19 || 2 || 2 || 0 || 0 || 1 || 20
|-
|11 ||align=left|Erfan Ali Saeed || 18:01 || 2-6 || 33 || 1-2 || 50 || 3-4 || 75 || 3 || 3 || 6 || 0 || 1 || 0 || 0 || 1 || 8
|-
|12 ||align=left|Mohammed Saleem Abdulla || 03:28 || 0-1 || 0 || 0-0 || 0 || 0-0 || 0 || 0 || 1 || 1 || 0 || 1 || 0 || 0 || 1 || 0
|-
|13 ||align=left|Mohammed Yousef || 19:20 || 3-9 || 33 || 1-3 || 33 || 0-0 || 0 || 1 || 2 || 3 || 0 || 1 || 2 || 1 || 5 || 7
|-
|14 ||align=left|Malek Saleem || colspan=16 align=left|Did not play 
|-
|15 ||align=left|Baker Ahmad Mohammed || 00:55 || 0-0 || 0 || 0-0 || 0 || 0-0 || 0 || 0 || 0 || 0 || 0 || 0 || 0 || 0 || 0 || 0
|-
|align=left colspan=2|Totals || || 27-72 || 38 || 5-25 || 20 || 12-14 || 86 || 19 || 29 || 48 || 12 || 14 || 4 || 1 || 22 || 71
|}

Hong Kong vs. Philippines

|-
|4 ||align=left|Man Chun Lam ||12||2/3||67||1/2||50||1/1||100||0||1||1||0||2||0||0||0||6 
|-
|5 ||align=left|Tsz Lai Lau ||2||0/1||0||0/1||0||0/0||0||0||0||0||0||0||0||0||0||0 
|-
|6 ||align=left|Ki Lee ||18||0/4||0||0/1||0||0/0||0||1||2||3||3||1||1||0||0||0 
|-
|7 ||align=left|Kim Wong Li ||33||2/14||14||1/4||25||1/1||100||4||2||6||3||0||0||0||0||6 
|-
|8 ||align=left|Siu Wing Chan ||21||6/12||50||4/9||44||0/0||0||1||2||3||0||4||2||0||0||16 
|-
|9 ||align=left|Tung Leung Lau ||11||1/2||50||0/0||0||1/2||50||1||1||2||0||2||1||0||0||3 
|-
|10 ||align=left|Yik Lun Chan ||18||1/8||13||0/4||0||0/0||0||0||1||1||1||3||1||2||0||2 
|-
|11 ||align=left|Chi Ho Poon ||colspan=16 align=left|Did not play 
|-
|12 ||align=left|Shing Yee Fong ||17||2/6||33||0/1||0||0/0||0||0||4||4||1||5||0||0||0||4 
|-
|13 ||align=left|Chun Wai Wong ||29||2/10||20||1/9||11||1/2||50||0||6||6||0||3||1||1||0||6 
|-
|14 ||align=left|Duncan Overbeck Reid ||35||5/15||33||0/1||0||2/4||50||7||12||19||2||1||4||1||0||12
|-
|15 ||align=left|Wai Kit Szeto ||colspan=16 align=left|Did not play 
|-
|align=left colspan=2|Totals ||200||21/75||28||7/32||22||6/10||60||14||31||45||10||21||10||4||0||55
|}

|-
|4 ||align=left|Jimmy Alapag ||13||0/4||0||0/4||0||1/2||50||0||2||2||1||0||0||0||1||1 
|-
|5 ||align=left|LA Tenorio ||17||3/7||43||1/4||25||2/2||100||1||0||1||1||2||2||0||0||9 
|-
|6 ||align=left|Jeffrei Chan ||21||4/8||50||3/5||60||1/1||100||0||1||1||0||0||0||0||0||12 
|-
|7 ||align=left|Jayson William ||25||2/3||67||0/0||0||7/8||88||2||4||6||5||0||0||1||0||11 
|-
|8 ||align=left|Gary David ||12||0/2||0||0/2||0||0/0||0||1||0||1||1||2||0||0||0||0 
|-
|9 ||align=left|Ranidel de Ocampo ||11||1/6||17||0/3||0||0/0||0||0||3||3||0||2||1||0||0||2 
|-
|10 ||align=left|Gabe Norwood ||28||4/6||67||1/2||50||2/3||67||2||8||10||1||3||1||1||1||11 
|-
|11 ||align=left|Marcus Douthit ||31||6/14||43||0/0||0||1/1||100||0||8||8||1||2||3||0||2||13 
|-
|12 ||align=left|Larry Fonacier ||14||1/5||20||0/4||0||0/0||0||0||0||0||0||0||0||0||0||2 
|-
|13 ||align=left|June Mar Fajardo ||2||0||0||0||0||0||0||0||0||0||0||0||0||0||0||0
|-
|14 ||align=left|Japeth Aguilar ||7||0/2||0||0/2||0||0||0||0||0||0||0||0||0||0||0||0 
|-
|15 ||align=left|Marc Pingris ||14||2/3||67||0/0||0||2/2||100||2||2||4||1||2||1||0||0||6 
|-
|align=left colspan=2|Totals ||200||23/60||38||5/24||21||16/19||84.21||8||28||36||11||13||8||2||4||67
|}

Group E
2013–14 in Jordanian basketball
Group
2013–14 in Taiwanese basketball
2013–14 in Hong Kong basketball
2013 in Qatari sport
2013 in Japanese sport